Dorie Barton is an American actor, writer, and director. She began her professional acting career working on a television soap opera and went on to appear in various theater, film, and television productions. She made her debut as a writer-director of film in 2016, and also teaches theater at Virginia Commonwealth University.

Early life 

Barton was an Army brat, meaning that her family lived in different places during her childhood, including Iowa and Virginia. She graduated from the California Institute of the Arts with a BFA degree in theater and went on to work in theater, television and films. In 2020, Barton completed her thesis for a MFA in Theatre from Virginia Commonwealth University School of the Arts.

Acting career

Barton began her acting career on One Life to Live, playing Beth Garvey, a runaway teenage mother, from 1993-94. When the character was written out of the show, the producers of One Life to Live gave her the option for what would happen to her character, and Barton opted for her character to die on-camera.

Her additional television roles include playing Tess Farraday in the sitcom Stark Raving Mad from 1999-2000. She also appeared in Angel, Justice League, Nowhere Man, Vanishing Son, and One Life to Live.

Film roles include How to Marry a Billionaire: A Christmas Tale (2000), Do You Wanna Know a Secret? (2001), Down with Love (2003), Just Desserts (2004), and God Bless America (2011).

Barton also provides voice-overs for films, video games and commercial ads.

Theater

Barton's stage appearances include: Sophistry, Lost Studio Theatre, Los Angeles, 1995; Edith Sussman, Die! Mommy! Die!, House of Sussman Company, Coast Playhouse, West Hollywood, CA, 1999; Secretary and Toni Newsome, Pentecost, Theatre of Note, Evidence Room Theatre, Los Angeles, 2002; and Cringe, Hollywood Stories, Evidence Room Theatre, 2002-2003. Barton also appeared as Paulinka in A Bright Room Called Day, and as a member of ensemble for a production of The Skin of Our Teeth. In 2006, she appeared in Kira Obolensky's play Lobster Alice with the Blank Theatre Company at 2nd Stage Theatre in Hollywood.

Directing career

Barton made her debut as writer-director with the feature film Girl Flu., which premiered at the Los Angeles Film Festival in 2016. It was a festival hit, screening at festivals worldwide and winning awards including the Audience Award (New Director category) at the Nashville Film Festival. The Hollywood Reporter wrote, "It's easy to wish Barton’s direction were more ambitious or her screenplay bolder, but there's a sincerity here, a lack of pretension and a generosity of spirit that proves infectious".

She co-directed She Kills Monsters: Virtual Realms.In 2021 she is writing and directing the upcoming movie Welcome to the Show.

Teaching career

Barton teaches theater at Virginia Commonwealth University, and serves as film director for VCU's Mainstage Productions. She directs the VCUarts Theatre Showcase Films for graduating acting students, providing a debut into the film industry, and also works as a consultant for scripts and film productions.

Awards
Audience Award in the New Director category at the Nashville Film Festival for Girl Flu (2016) 
Selected as a finalist for the Commercial Diversity Director’s Program (2018)

 Filmography 

 1993–1994: Love, Lie, Passion (One Life to Live , TV series)
 1995: Delinquent's Derby
 1999: Foreign Correspondents
 1999–2000: Men without Nerves ( Stark Raving Mad , TV series, 20 episodes)
 2000: How to Marry a Billionaire: A Christmas Tale (TV movie)
 2001: Do You Wanna Know a Secret?
 2001: The Kidnapping of Chris Burden
 2002: Baby Bob (TV series, two episodes)
 2002: My Wife, Her Dad, and I ( In-Laws , TV series, two episodes)
 2003: Down with Love - To the devil with love! (Down with Love) 2003: Martha, Inc .: The Story of Martha Stewart (TV movie)
 2003: Justice League ( Justice League , television series, two episodes, Voice)
 2003–2004: I'm with Her (TV series, four episodes)
 2004: Love for Dessert ( Just Desserts , TV movie)
 2004: Meet the Fockers 2005: Bewitched 2006: What I Did for Love (TV movie)
 2006: Roasted and Sold (Grilled) 2008: The Nanny Express (TV movie)
 2009: All About Steve (All About Steve)''
 2009: Otis E.
 2011: God Bless America
 2012–2013: Ave 43 (TV series, seven episodes)

References

External links
 
Official site

Living people
American film actresses
American television actresses
American directors
American screenwriters
Year of birth missing (living people)
21st-century American women